Mostafizur or Mustafizur Rahman may refer to:

 Mustafizur Rahman (born 1995), Bangladeshi cricketer
 Mustafizur Rahman (general) (1941–2008), Bangladeshi Army general
 Mostafizur Rahman (politician) (born 1953), Bangladeshi politician
 Mostafizur Rahman Manik, Bangladeshi film director
 Muhammad Mustafizur Rahman, Bangladeshi Islamic scholar
 Mustafizur Rahman Siddiqi (1925–1992), Bangladeshi entrepreneur, politician and diplomat
 A. S. M. Mustafizur Rahman (1934–1996), Bangladeshi Army officer and politician